Wittsteinia is a small genus of flowering plants in the family Alseuosmiaceae. The genus was first formally described by botanist Ferdinand von Mueller in Fragmenta Phytographiae Australiae in 1861. The name honours Dr Georg Christian Wittstein, the author of an etymological dictionary used as a reference by Mueller.

The genus comprises two species:
Wittsteinia papuana (Steen.) Steen. – from Papua New Guinea
Wittsteinia vacciniacea F.Muell. – Baw Baw berry, from Victoria, Australia

References

Asterales genera
Alseuosmiaceae